The 1979 All-Pacific-10 Conference football team consists of American football players chosen by various organizations for All-Pacific-10 Conference teams for the 1979 NCAA Division I-A football season.

Offensive selections

Quarterbacks
 Paul McDonald, USC (AP-1)
Rich Campbell, California (AP-2)

Running backs
 Charles White, USC (AP-1)
 Freeman McNeil, UCLA (AP-1)
 Joe Steele, Washington (AP-1)

Wide receivers
 Ken Margerum, Stanford (AP-1)
 Steve Courey, Oregon St. (AP-1)

Tight ends
  Hoby Brenner, USC (AP-1)

Tackles
 Keith Van Horne, USC (AP-1)
 Tom Turnure, Washington (AP-1)

Guards
 Brad Budde, USC (AP-1)
Roy Foster, USC (AP-1)

Centers
Allan Kennedy, Washington St. (AP-1)

Defensive selections

Linemen
 Doug Martin, Washington (AP-1)
Bob Kohrs, Arizona St. (AP-1)
Vince Goldsmith, Oregon (AP-1)
Cleveland Crosby, Arizona (AP-1)

Linebackers
 Dennis Johnson, USC (AP-1)
 Antowaine Richardson, Washington (AP-1)
 Bruce Harrell, Washington (AP-1)
 Riki Gray, USC (AP-1)

Defensive backs
 Kenny Easley, UCLA (AP-1)
 Mark Lee, Washington (AP-1)
Ronnie Lott, USC (AP-1)

Special teams

Placekickers
Ken Naber, Stanford (AP-1)

Punters
Ken Naber, Stanford (AP-1)

Return specialist
Mark Lee, Washington (AP-1)

Key

AP = Associated Press

See also
1979 College Football All-America Team

References

All-Pacific-10 Conference Football Team
All-Pac-12 Conference football teams